Money Means Nothing is a 1934 American drama film, directed by Christy Cabanne. It stars Wallace Ford, Gloria Shea, and Edgar Kennedy, and was released on June 14, 1934.

Cast list
 Wallace Ford as Ken McKay
 Gloria Shea as Julie Ferris McKay
 Edgar Kennedy as Herbert Green
 Vivien Oakland as Helen Whitney
 Maidel Turner as Mrs. Green
 Betty Blythe as Mrs. Ferris
 Eddie Tamblyn as Robby Ferris
 Richard Tucker as George Whitney
 Tenen Holtz as Silverman
 Ann Brody as Mrs. Silverman

References

External links 
 
 
 

Films directed by Christy Cabanne
Monogram Pictures films
American comedy-drama films
1934 comedy-drama films
American black-and-white films
1934 films
1930s American films